Virginia Grütter (born Virginia Teresa del Carmen and Inés, Puntarenas, Costa Rica, 20 April 1929 – 3 March 2000) was a Costa Rican writer, actress and theatrical director. In the year 2000 she died of respiratory failure.

Publications 
Poetry
 "Give me your hand"  (1954).
 "Poetry of this world"  (1973).
 "Cradle songs and of battle"  (1994). Áncora Prize of Literature in 1996.
Prose
 "Friends and the wind" (the original title was "Boris") (1978).
 "Missing"  (1980).
 "Singing to my time: memories"  (1998).

References 

 Grutter, V. (1998). Singing to my time: memories. Saint José: Publishing Women.
 Monge Meza, C.F. (1984). The separate image: ideological models of the poetry costarricense, 1950–1980. Saint José: Institute of the Book, MCJD.
 Quesada Soto, To. (2010). Brief history of the literature costarricense. Saint José: Publisher Costa Rica.
 Ugalde, And. (2010). Virginia Grutter. In: Club of Books. Recovered on 25 September of the 2012: http://www.clubdelibros.com/biografias/183-virginia-grutter.html
 Víquez Guzmán, B. (2009). Virginia Grutter Jiménez. In: the Literary art and his Theory. Recovered on 25 September of the 2012:
http://heredia-costarica.zonalibre.org/archives/2009/09/virginia-grutter-jimenez.html

External links 
 Poems of Virginia Grütter in the official place of the National Institute of the Women of Costa Rica:
 Poems of Virginia Grütter in the program Further of the syllable, poetic anthology costarricense. Of the State University to Distance of Costa Rica:
 Technical index card of the film "Virginia Grütter: stronger that the pain" in the official place of the film-maker Quinka F. Stoehr: 

2000 deaths
1929 births
Costa Rican women poets
People from Puntarenas Province
20th-century Costa Rican poets
20th-century actresses
20th-century Costa Rican women writers
Costa Rican stage actresses
Academic staff of the University of Costa Rica
Deaths from respiratory failure